The Huanghai Landscape V3 or Huanghai Qisheng V3 (黄海 旗胜V3), also known as the Huanghai NCV before production, is a mid-size crossover SUV produced and sold by SG Automotive (曙光汽车) under the Huanghai Auto (黄海) marque.

Overview

The Huanghai Landscape V3 was revealed during the 2010 Beijing Auto Show with the actual production version launched during the 2011 Shanghai Auto Show with a price range from 105,800 yuan to 119,800 yuan.

Powertrain
The Huanghai Landscape V3 is offered as either a 4×2 or 4×4. Engine could be had with a 2.0 liter engine, a 2.4 liter engine and a 2.5 liter diesel engine. The 2.4 liter engine has 105kw and 200nm, and a top speed of 160km/h.

Design controversies
The styling of the Huanghai Landscape V3 was especially controversial as the exterior design is a complete copy of the second generation Lexus RX luxury crossover.

References

External links 

 SG Automotive official site

Landscape V3
Crossover sport utility vehicles
All-wheel-drive vehicles
Front-wheel-drive vehicles
Cars introduced in 2011
2010s cars
Cars of China